Salem el-Masri (سالم المصري) is allegedly an explosives trainer with Al-Jihad, who worked first in Afghanistan, and then in Khartoum at the Al-Damazin Farms project owned by Osama bin Laden.

Life
El-Masri was believed by Jamal al-Fadl to have trained with Hezbollah in Southern Lebanon, before finding himself attached to the Egyptian militant movement led by Ayman al-Zawahiri.

He was part of a group of Al-Qaeda trainers invited to go to Lebanon, after Hezbollah consulted with Iran. The group also included Abu Taha al-Sudan, Saif al-Islam el-Masry, and Saif al-Adel.

According to a testimony by Jamal al-Fadl he taught the proper use of explosives in the Jihad Wahl training camp.

Jamal al-Fadl testified in 2001 that he had seen el-Masri at the Al-Damazin Farms.  The Damazine Farm on the outskirts of Damazine City was an al-Qaeda farm that was used for food production as well as a training location.

References

Possibly living people
Egyptian Islamic Jihad